Shock: Injury, Inflammation, and Sepsis: Laboratory and Clinical Approaches  is the official journal of the Shock Society, the European Shock Society, the Indonesian Shock Society, the International Federation of Shock Societies, and the Official and International Journal of the Japan Shock Society.  The journal publishes scholarly research reports on basic and clinical studies of shock, trauma, sepsis, inflammation, ischemia, and related pathobiological states, with particular emphasis on the biologic mechanisms that determine the response to such injury. This scholarly journal has both print and online version. The journal has an impact factor of 3.203 and publishes 12 issues per year.

References

External links 
 Shock Journal website
North American Shock Society website

Publications established in 1994
Emergency medicine journals
Lippincott Williams & Wilkins academic journals
Monthly journals